George Stanley Patterson (1887 – 1955) was an English football manager and secretary who was involved with Liverpool for much of the first half of the 20th century. After a playing career spent mostly with Marine F.C., Patterson joined Liverpool in 1908 as assistant to Tom Watson. After a spell as club secretary, he replaced Matt McQueen as manager in 1928. However, he was not successful and resigned in 1936 citing ill health. He continued on as club secretary.

Patterson was born in Liverpool, Lancashire in England in 1887. He died on May 8, 1955 in Skerries Road, Liverpool.

References

External links
 Management statistics at Soccerbase
 Manager profile at LFChistory.net (first term)
  Manager profile at LFChistory.net (second term)

1887 births
Patterson, George
Patterson, George
Patterson, George
Marine F.C. players
Association footballers not categorized by position
English footballers